Pretoria Callies Football Club, also known as Bantu Callies or Pretoria Bantu Callies is a South African professional soccer club based in Pretoria, Gauteng, who currently play in the National First Division.

History
The club was founded in 1898, and were founder members of the National Professional Soccer League, later playing in the National Soccer League.

In 2020, the club earned promotion to the National First Division as runners-up of the 2019–20 SAFA Second Division.

Stadium
Callies play at the Lucas Masterpieces Moripe Stadium in Atteridgeville.

Honours
 2019–20 SAFA Second Division runners-up

References

External links
Pretoria Callies at Soccerway

Association football clubs established in 1898
National First Division clubs
1898 establishments in South Africa
Soccer clubs in Pretoria